The Oti Region is one of the six newly created regions of Ghana in December 2018. The region was carved out of the northern part of the Volta Region and will be in fulfillment of a campaign promise made by New Patriotic Party. Prior to the 2016 Ghanaian general election, the then candidate Nana Akufo-Addo declared that when elected, he would explore the possibility of creating new regions out of some of the existing regions in Ghana in order to bring government closer to citizens.

History 
The execution of plans for the creation of the regions was seeded to the newly created Ministry of Regional Reorganization and Development which is under the leadership of Hon. Dan Botwe. Government of Ghana ministry charged with the responsibility of supervising the creation of new regions in Ghana. In March 2017, the ministry sent the blue print for the creation of the region along with others to the Council of State. The council met over 36 times from the time of submission to August 2017. The final stage for the creation of the region was decided through a referendum by the people within the catchment of the new region. A referendum on 27 December 2018 approved the creation of Oti Region. On election day, 323,708 out of 366,481 (88.33% voter turnout) registered voters cast their votes. A total of 319,296 (98.64 per cent) voted Yes and 2,878 voted No (0.89 per cent) while the number of rejected ballots was 951 (0.24 per cent).

Administrative divisions
The political administration of the region is through the local government system. Under this administration system, the region is divided into eight MMDA's (made up of 0 Metropolitan, 2 Municipal and 6 Ordinary Assemblies). Each District, Municipal or Metropolitan Assembly, is administered by a Chief Executive, representing the central government but deriving authority from an Assembly headed by a presiding member elected from among the members themselves. The current list is as follows:

Geography and climate

Location and size 
The Oti Region is bordered on the north by the Northern region, to the south by the Volta Region, and to the west by the Volta Lake. It has 9 districts.

Climate and vegetation 
The Oti Region is much drier than the rest of the southern areas of Ghana, due to its proximity to the north. The vegetation consist of mostly of grassland, especially savanna with clusters of drought-resistant trees such as baobabs or acacias. Between December and April is the dry season. The wet season is between about May and November with an average annual rainfall of 750 to 1050 mm (30 to 40 inches). The highest temperatures are reached at the end of the dry season, the lowest in December and January. However, the hot Harmattan wind from the Sahara blows frequently between December and the beginning of February. The temperatures can vary between 14 °C (59 °F) at night and 40 °C (104 °F) during the day.

Natural Resource Potential 
The Ghana Geological Survey Authority has discovered large quantities of Iron ore deposits in Akokrowa, a farming community in the Oti Region of Ghana. The iron ore, according to the geological investigation, is 55.22 weight percent (Fe) and of a higher grade. It is anticipated that the exploration and the business of the Iron will create jobs and wealth for the people of Oti and the country in general.

Tourism & Parks 

 Kyabobo National Park
 Lake Volta
 Breast Mountain, Chilinga
 Chaiso Forest Reserve
 Hanging Village, Shiare

References 

 
Regions of Ghana
2018 in Ghana
French-speaking countries and territories